The Jhukar Phase, was a phase of the Late Harappan culture in Sindh that continued after the decline of the mature Indus Valley civilisation in the 2nd millennium BC. It is named after the archaeological type site called Jhukar in Sindh. It was, in turn, followed by the Jhangar Phase.

Jhukar and Jhangar phases are collectively called  Jhukar and Jhangar culture (1900 - 1500 BCE). Cemetery H culture (subculture of Late Harrapan IVC Phase) in Punjab was contemporaneous to Jhukar-Jhangar culture (subculture of Late Harrapan IVC Phase) in Sindh, both have evidence of continuity and change. Jhukar culture is associated with the sites excavated at Jhukar, Chanchudaro and Amri (Amri also as an earlier and distinct Amri culture belonging to earlier phases of IVC).  Rangpur culture in Gujarat, also part of Late Phase of IVC, was also contemporaneous to both.

The pottery of this phase is described as "showing some continuity with mature Harappan pottery traditions." During this phase, urban features of cities (such as Mohenjo-Daro) disappeared, and artifacts such as stone weights and female figurines became rare. This phase is characterized by some circular stamp seals with geometric designs, although lacking the Indus script which characterized the preceding phase of the civilization. Script is rare and confined to potsherd inscriptions. There was also a decline in long-distance trade.

See also

 Chronological dating
 Phases in archaeology
 Pottery in the Indian subcontinent
 Periodisation of the Indus Valley civilisation
 Ahar-Banas culture
 Late Harappan Phase of IVC (1900 - 1500 BCE)
 Cemetery H culture in Punjab
 Jhukar-Jhangar culture in Punjab
 Rangpur culture in Gujarat
 Vedic period
 Kuru Kingdom (1200 – c. 500 BCE)
 OCP (2000-1500 BCE) 
 Copper Hoard culture (2800-1500 BCE), may or may not be independent of vedic culture

References

Bronze Age Asia
Prehistoric India
History of Pakistan